The 2016–17 season will be Bradford City's 114th season in their history, their 102nd in the Football League and 104th in the English football league system. Along with League One, the club will also compete in the FA Cup, League Cup and Football League Trophy.

The season covers the period from 1 July 2016 to 30 June 2017.

Following the Championship play-off final where Huddersfield Town were victorious, Bradford City received a sum of £250,000 for former striker Nahki Wells.

Pre-season

League One

League table

Matches
On 22 June 2016, the fixtures for the forthcoming season were announced.

Play-offs

FA Cup

EFL Cup

EFL Trophy

Squad statistics

Statistics accurate as of 20 May 2017

Transfers

Transfers in

Transfers out

Loans in

Loans out

References

Bradford City A.F.C. seasons
Bradford City